Wehr is a municipality in the district of Ahrweiler, in Rhineland-Palatinate, Germany. Wehr is a small village off Bundesautobahn 61.

References

Ahrweiler (district)